The heavily fortified "Green zone" – where most government ministries and foreign embassies are – was attacked when two parked car bombs exploded outside the Foreign Affairs ministry, killing 11 people and injuring 15 others. Soon after, a suicide bomber walked into a restaurant near the "Green zone" and detonated his explosive device, killing an additional eight people and wounding 12 others. A third car bomb exploded on a commercial street in a northern suburb of Baghdad killing four and injuring eight. A total of 32 people were killed in the four blasts.

References

2014 murders in Iraq
21st-century mass murder in Iraq
Mass murder in 2014
Terrorist incidents in Iraq in 2014
Terrorist incidents in Baghdad
Attacks on buildings and structures in Iraq